Stanley Chapman (15 September 1925 – 26 May 2009) was a British architect, designer, translator and writer. His interests included theatre and 'pataphysics. He was involved with founding the National Theatre of London, was a member of Oulipo of the year 1961, founder of the Outrapo and a member also of the French Collège de 'Pataphysique, the London Institute of 'Pataphysics and the Lewis Carroll Society. In the early 1950s he contributed poems and designed covers for the literary magazines Listen and Stand and contributed translations to Chanticleer, a magazine edited by the poet Ewart Milne. His English translation of A Hundred Thousand Billion Poems was received with "admiring stupefaction" by Raymond Queneau.

Some publications
 Onze mille verbes, cent virgules Temps Mêlés n° 98, Verviers, 1969.
 Messaline au Bistrot Dragée Haute n°21. 1996. Publié par Noël Arnaud.
 Epopélerinage Dragée Haute n°35. 1999. Publié par Noël Arnaud.

Some translations
 Everyone Knows by Raymond Queneau
 Darwin certainly saw the importance of the earthworm by Raymond Queneau
 Heartsnatcher by Boris Vian
 Froth on the Daydream by Boris Vian
 Autumn in Pekin by Boris Vian (unpublished)
 The Night-Watch by Arthur Rimbaud [a poem actually by Desnos] in Liberty or Love by Robert Desnos. The novel itself was translated by Terry Hale.
  Camille Renault, 1866–1954, World-Maker. by Jean Hugues Sainmont [pseudonym of Emmanuel Peillet]
 Deliquescences by Adoré Floupette
 Bibi-La-Bibiste by Raymonde Linossier

References

External links
 Stanley Chapman
 l'Oulipo site (in French)
 l'Outrapo site (in French)
 L.I.P. website

1925 births
British writers
Pataphysicians
Oulipo members
2009 deaths